How Starbucks Saved My Life: A Son of Privilege Learns to Live Like Everyone Else is a memoir by Michael Gates Gill that chronicles his journey from a high-level advertising executive with J. Walter Thompson to a barista at Starbucks. The book has been optioned by Tom Hanks for a film; filmmaker Gus Van Sant has also been in talks to direct. Gill is the son of famed The New Yorker writer Brendan Gill, and the brother of Charles Gill, author of the 1987 fiction book The Boozer Challenge.

Synopsis
Michael Gates Gill had it all by his fifties: a mansion in the suburbs, a wife and loving children, a six-figure salary, and an Ivy League education. Within a few years, he lost his job, got divorced, and was diagnosed with a brain tumor. With no money or health insurance, he got a job at Starbucks.

An unexpected teacher opens his eyes to what living well really looks like. She is a young African American, the daughter of a drug addict; he is used to being the boss but reports to her now. For the first time in his life he experiences being a member of a minority trying hard to survive in a challenging new job. He learns the value of hard work and humility, as well as what it truly means to respect another person.

References

American memoirs
2007 non-fiction books
Gotham Books books
Starbucks in popular culture